Comme un aimant (released in the USA as The Magnet) is a 2000 French film by Kamel Saleh and Akhenaton. It depicts eight young people living in the district of Panier, in Marseille.

The film's title means 'like a magnet', and is a reference to a line in the film accusing two characters of being lazy and 'sitting there with your asses stuck to that bench like a magnet'.

Cast
Akhenaton as Sauveur
Kamel Saleh as Cahouètte
Brahim Aimad as Bra-Bra
Freeman as Kakou
Houari Djerir as Houari
Kamel Ferrat as Fouad
Titoff as Santino
Sofiane Madjid Mammeri as Christian
Khalil Mohamed as Kader
Virginie Gallo as Nathalie
Nadège Mignien as Béatrice
Bérangère Topart as Sylvie
Ahamed Abdou as Jackson

Soundtrack
The film's soundtrack is written by Mario Castiglia, and it includes songs by IAM, Millie Jackson, Dennis Edwards of the Temptations, Isaac Hayes and Cunnie Williams.

In popular culture
The film's title "Comme un aimant" is also a song by IAM, a French hip hop band from Marseille which Akhenaton and Freeman, two of the actors, belong to.

External links 
 Comme un aimant at the Internet Movie Database.

2000 films
French crime drama films
Films scored by Bruno Coulais
2000s French films